is a former Japanese football player.

Tanaka played for Vissel Kobe, JEF United Chiba, Sagan Tosu and Verspah Oita. He played in the J2 League during the 2007 season for Sagan.

Club statistics

References

External links

1983 births
Living people
Doshisha University alumni
Association football people from Osaka Prefecture
People from Takatsuki, Osaka
Japanese footballers
J1 League players
J2 League players
Japan Football League players
Vissel Kobe players
JEF United Chiba players
Sagan Tosu players
Verspah Oita players
Association football defenders